Mohammadpur is a local market in the Gopalganj district of Bihar state, India, located at . National Highway 101 ends in Mohammadpur. The nearest airport is Patna Airport.

References

Villages in East Champaran district